Flower constancy or pollinator constancy is the tendency of individual pollinators to exclusively visit certain flower species or morphs within a species, bypassing other available flower species that could potentially contain more nectar. This type of foraging behavior puts selective pressures on floral traits in a process called pollinator-mediated selection. Flower constancy is different from other types of insect specialization such as innate preferences for certain colors or flower types, or the tendency of pollinators to visit the most rewarding and abundant flowers.

Flower constancy has been observed for insect pollinators: especially honeybees (Apis mellifera), bumblebees (Bombus terrestris), and butterflies (Thymelicus flavus). For example, honeybees have demonstrated a preference for certain flower types and constantly return even if other more rewarding flowers are available. This is shown for example in experiments where honeybees remain flower constant and do not attempt to feed on other available flowers that exhibit an alternative color to their preferred flower type.

Flower constancy as an adaptive behavior 

Flower constancy favors flower pollination, that is, pollinators that are flower constant are more likely to transfer pollen to other conspecific plants. Also, flower constancy prevents the loss of pollen during interspecific flights and pollinators from clogging stigmas with pollen of other flower species. Flower constancy can be enhanced when the flowers are more dissimilar, for example in their coloration. When, in a community of flowering plants, the flowers are all similarly colored, the constancy is often lower because different species are more difficult to distinguish, whereas constancy tends to be higher when the flowers are distinctly differently colored.

Flower constancy benefits flower pollination but, arguably, constancy is not so obviously adaptive for pollinators. Individuals that show constant behavior ignore other flowers that could potentially provide more nectar (reward) than their preferred type. As a result, flower constancy seems to contradict optimal foraging models, which assume that animals will move minimal distances between food resources and so will feed on a mixture of these to maximize their energy intake per unit time.  As a result of this apparent contradiction, many hypotheses have been proposed to explain flower constancy in insects to determine the adaptability of flower constancy. One of the most popular explanations is that insects that are flower constant have limited memory space and can only focus on one flower type at a time.

Memory limitation as an explanation for flower constancy 

Insects, as with other animals, have short-term memory (STM) or "working memory" where information is stored temporarily for a few second or minutes. Additionally, insects have long-term memory (LTM) or "reference memory", which stores information for hours or more. One of the most widespread explanations for flower constancy is that insects can only identify and handle one flower type or species at a time. Conversely, there are others that argue that insects, for example bees, can store large amounts of information (location of nest, flower patches, and existence of surrounding landmarks) in their LTM or reference memory.

Other hypotheses that might explain flower constancy

Learning investment hypothesis
The learning investment hypothesis refers to the ability of an insect to learn a motor skill to handle and obtain nectar from a flower type or species. Learning these motor skills could require substantial investment and switching to other flower types or species could be inefficient and consequently non-adaptive. Concentrating and feeding on one particular flower type increases the insect's efficiency to obtain nectar from that flower type with respect to other flower types that are available.

Costly information hypothesis
The costly information hypothesis explains flower constancy based on the fact that insects stay constant and feed on a one flower type because they know they are obtaining a reliable reward: nectar. The insect therefore does not venture to feed on other flower types because it cannot predict the amount of nectar in other flowers and could essentially waste foraging time probing other flowers that could possibly contain less nectar.

Resource-partitioning hypothesis
In social foragers, flower constancy could benefit the colony in that foragers avoid competition with other foragers by specializing on a specific flower type or species. In this case, individual insects, for example bees, become flower constant to avoid competition and thus increase foraging efficiency.

References

Pollination
Behavioral ecology